Kaufman House may refer to:

Kaufmann Desert House, Palm Springs, California, designed by Richard Neutra
Frank J. Kaufman House in Columbus, Ohio, listed on the NRHP in Columbus, Ohio
H. L. Kaufman House, in Enid, Oklahoma, listed on the NRHP in Garfield County, Oklahoma
E. C. Kaufman House, in Victoria, Texas, listed on the NRHP in Victoria County, Texas
Fallingwater, Mill Run, Pennsylvania, also known as the Edgar J. Kaufmann Sr. Residence, designed by Frank Lloyd Wright